Customs Frontline, previously known as War Customised, is an upcoming Hong Kong action film directed by Herman Yau and starring Jacky Cheung, Nicholas Tse, Karena Lam, Cya Liu, with Francis Ng making a special appearance. The film revolves around the Customs and Excise Department of Hong Kong.

Production for Customs Frontline began on 30 March 2022 and ended on 20 June 2022, while it is set for release in 2023.

Cast
Jacky Cheung as Cheung Wan-nam (張允南), a senior superintendent of the Customs and Excise Department (Hong Kong)
Nicholas Tse as Chow Ching-lai (周正禮), an assistant superintendent of the Customs and Excise Department.
Karena Lam as an assistant commissioner of the Customs and Excise Department.
Cya Liu as a Thai intelligence officer.
Francis Ng as Kwok Chi-keung (郭子強), assistant commissioner of Boundary and Ports in the Customs and Excise Department. (special appearance)
Kenny Kwan as a Customs officer.
Michelle Wai as a Customs officer.
Carlos Chan as a critical witness being investigated by the Customs and Excise Department.
Angus Yeung as a Customs officer.
Michelle Yim
Shek Sau as the commissioner of the Customs and Excise Department.
Melvin Wong as a businessman who assists the commissioner in solving a case.
Ben Yuen
Amanda Strang
James Kazama
Brahim Chab
Polly Lau
Chu Tin
Kenneth Lai
Jordan Merna
Payne Roberts

Production
News for the film first appeared on 20 February 2022 where it was announced that Herman Yau would be directing a film revolving around the Hong Kong Customs Department and is set to star Nicholas Tse and Cya Liu, with Tse also working as action director for the first time in the film. Tse's manager, Mani Fok confirmed the news and stated the film was in pre-production. The film was originally set to began production on 3 March 2022, but due to crew members testing positive for COVID-19, production commencement was postponed to three weeks later. On 21 March 2022, production company Emperor Motion Pictures promoted the film at the virtual Hong Kong International Film & TV Market (FILMART) and unveiled additional cast members including Jacky Cheung, Karena Lam and Francis Ng, who will be making a special appearance.

Principal photography for Customs Frontline began on 30 March 2022, where filming of an interior scene with Tse and Liu took place. On 6 April 2022, the film held its production commencement ceremony hosted by Emperor Motion Pictures chairman and executive producer Albert Yeung and attended by the cast and crew. The same day, filming of a warehouse raiding scene involving Cheung and Tse took place in Lau Fau Shan.

Production for Customs Frontline  officially wrapped up on 20 June 2022, where a special banquet hosted by Yeung was held to congratulate the cast and crew for the film's completion.

References

External links

2023 films
2023 action thriller films
Upcoming films
Hong Kong action thriller films
2020s Cantonese-language films
Emperor Motion Pictures films
Films directed by Herman Yau
Films set in Hong Kong
Films shot in Hong Kong